The Greater Nile Petroleum Operating Company (GNPOC) is a petroleum exploration and production company operating in Sudan. It was incorporated on 18 June 1997 and undertook construction of the Greater Nile Oil Pipeline which links Sudan's inland oil fields with refineries at Khartoum and Port Sudan.

The GNPOC concession in the Western Upper Nile area includes the large Unity and Heglig oil fields plus smaller fields at El Toor, El Noor, Toma South, Bamboo, Munga and Diffra.

Stakeholders 
GNPOC is a joint operating company owned by:

 China National Petroleum Corporation: 40%
 Petronas Carigali Overseas of Malaysia: 30%
 ONGC Videsh (the overseas arm of ONGC) of India: 25%
 Sudapet (Sudan National Petroleum Corporation, the national oil company of Sudan): 5%

Both Gulf Petroleum and Al Thani Corporation formerly owned a 5% share each. Canadian company Talisman Energy (previously known as Arakis) was an original stakeholder. Its share was sold to ONGC Videsh in 2003.

The U.S. government imposed economic sanctions against Sudan in 1997, due to the Sudanese government's alleged sponsorship of international terrorism and poor human rights record. The sanctions prohibited trade between the United States and Sudan, as well as investment by U.S. businesses in Sudan. In February 2000, the U.S. government extended its sanctions to include Sudapet and GNPOC. These sanctions were lifted after the Sudanese revolution of 2018/19 and ensuing negotiations between the two governments at the end of 2020.

See also 

 Economy of Sudan
 Greater Nile Oil Pipeline
 SPPHC
 GNPOC Headquarters Building

References

External links 
 GNPOC company website

Oil and gas companies of Sudan
Companies based in Khartoum
Energy companies established in 1997
Non-renewable resource companies established in 1997
1997 establishments in Sudan
Oil and Natural Gas Corporation